Ada Afoluwake Ogunkeye  (born November 25, 1986) known professionally as Folu Storms, is a Nigerian radio host and presenter, actress, voice-over artist, and television host.

Early life 
Storms was born in Aguda, Surulere, Lagos state. She attended primary school at Corona VI, then had her secondary education first at The Lagoon Secondary School, then St Leonards Mayfield in the UK and then proceeded to Aberystwyth University where she studied for a Bachelor of Laws (LLB) between 2005 and 2008. Storms later enrolled at the University of Bristol for her Master of Laws (LLM) in 2009. Storms has a diploma in Broadcast Journalism from Pan-African University.

Career

Radio and NdaniTV 

Storms began to work as a lawyer, before she started with the radio station 92.3 Inspiration fm in 2012. She competed for the MTV Base Africa's VJ search and she was one of the three finalists. Storms was later hired by the Nigerian company Ndani TV as a presenter and content producer where she produced The New Africa documentary which was nominated for best documentary award at the 2016 Africa Magic Viewers Choice Awards. She co-hosted the Breakfast show at Smooth 98.1FM in Lagos and was still doing this in 2019.

Storms won the 2017 Ebony Life TV Sisterhood Awards for TV Personality of the Year the 2018 On-Air Personality award for the Future awards and ELOY Awards.

MTV Shuga Alone Together 
The role of "Sope" was included when it went into a mini-series titled MTV Shuga Alone Together highlighting the problems of Coronavirus in April 2020. The series was written by Tunde Aladese and broadcast every night - its backers include the World Health Organization. The series was based in Nigeria, South Africa, Kenya and Côte d'Ivoire and the story progresses using online conversations on location between the characters. All of the makeup and filming was done by the actors who include Lerato Walaza, Mamarumo Marokane, and Jemima Osunde.

Filmography

Awards and nominations

References

Nigerian television presenters
Nigerian television actresses
Nigerian women television presenters
Alumni of Aberystwyth University
People from Lagos State
Living people
1986 births
21st-century Nigerian actresses
Nigerian film actresses
Alumni of the University of Bristol
Nigerian television personalities
Nigerian media personalities
Nigerian radio presenters
Nigerian women radio presenters
Nigerian documentary filmmakers
Nigerian television talk show hosts